Pseudocomotis is a genus of moths belonging to the family Tortricidae.

Species
Pseudocomotis agatharcha Meyrick, 1926
Pseudocomotis albolineana Brown, 1990
Pseudocomotis chingualana Razowski & Wojtusiak, 2009
Pseudocomotis citroleuca Meyrick, 1912
Pseudocomotis nortena Brown, 1998
Pseudocomotis razowskii Pelz, 2004
Pseudocomotis scardiana Dognin, 1905
Pseudocomotis serendipita Brown, 1990

References

 , 1990, Ent. Scand. 20: 440.
 , 1998: A new species of Pseudocomotis from Costa Rica, including the first reported female of the genus (Lepidoptera: Tortricidae: Chlidanotinae). Tropical Lepidoptera Research 9 (2): 55-57. Full article: .
 , 2005, World catalogue of insects volume 5 Tortricidae
 , 2004: Description of a new species of Pseudocomotis Brown, 1989 from Ecuador (Lepidoptera: Tortricidae: Chlidanotini). Entomologische Zeitschrift 114 (3): 131-133.
 , 2009: Tortricidae (Lepidoptera) from the mountains of Ecuador and remarks on their geographical distribution. Part IV. Eastern Cordillera. Acta Zoologica Cracoviensia 51B (1-2): 119-187. doi:10.3409/azc.52b_1-2.119-187. Full article: .

External links
tortricidae.com

Chlidanotini
Tortricidae genera